The 2019 Oracle Challenger Series – New Haven was a professional tennis tournament played on outdoor hard courts. This tournament was part of the 2019 ATP Challenger Tour and the 2019 WTA 125K series. The first edition took place from September 2 to 8, 2019 at the Cullman-Heyman Tennis Center in New Haven, United States.

Men's singles main-draw entrants

Seeds

 1 Rankings are as of 26 August 2019.

Other entrants
The following players received wildcards into the singles main draw:
  Petros Chrysochos
  Aleksandar Kovacevic
  Dylan King
  John McNally
  Evan Zhu

The following player received entry into the singles main draw using a protected ranking:
  Raymond Sarmiento

The following players received entry into the singles main draw as alternates:
  Alafia Ayeni
  Ulises Blanch
  Simon Carr
  Strong Kirchheimer

The following players received entry from the qualifying draw:
  Liam Broady
  Felix Corwin

Women's singles main-draw entrants

Seeds

 1 Rankings are as of 26 August 2019.

Other entrants
The following players received wildcards into the singles main draw:
  Lauren Davis
  Jennifer Elie
  Haley Giavara
  Samantha Martinelli

The following players received entry into the singles main draw through protected rankings:
  Victoria Duval
  Anna-Lena Friedsam

The following players received entry into the singles main draw as alternates:
  Rosalyn Small
  Rosalie van der Hoek

The following players received entry from the qualifying draw:
  Jaimee Fourlis 
  Eri Hozumi

Withdrawals
Before the tournament
  Kristie Ahn → replaced by  Jamie Loeb
  Robin Anderson → replaced by  Valeria Savinykh
  Madison Brengle → replaced by  Mayo Hibi
  Zarina Diyas → replaced by  Lizette Cabrera
  Kirsten Flipkens → replaced by  Quinn Gleason
  Giulia Gatto-Monticone → replaced by  Johanna Larsson
  Daria Gavrilova → replaced by  Momoko Kobori
  Magda Linette → replaced by  Victoria Duval
  Beatriz Haddad Maia → replaced by  Fanny Stollár
  Barbora Krejčíková → replaced by  Danielle Lao
  Caty McNally → replaced by  Elizabeth Halbauer
  Monica Niculescu → replaced by  Rosalyn Small
  Jessica Pegula → replaced by  Katherine Sebov
  Laura Siegemund → replaced by  Rosalie van der Hoek
  Patricia Maria Țig → replaced by  Ann Li
  Taylor Townsend → replaced by  Catherine Harrison
  Sachia Vickery → replaced by  Usue Maitane Arconada

Women's doubles main-draw entrants

Seeds 

 Rankings are as of 26 August 2019

Champions

Men's singles

 Tommy Paul def.  Marcos Giron 6–3, 6–3.

Women's singles

  Anna Blinkova def.  Usue Maitane Arconada 6–4, 6–2

Men's doubles

 Robert Galloway /  Nathaniel Lammons def.  Sander Gillé /  Joran Vliegen 7–5, 6–4.

Women's doubles

  Anna Blinkova /  Oksana Kalashnikova def.  Usue Maitane Arconada /  Jamie Loeb 6–2, 4–6, [10–4]

References

External links 
 Official website

2019
2019 ATP Challenger Tour
2019 WTA 125K series
2019 in American tennis
September 2019 sports events in the United States
Tennis in Connecticut
2019 in sports in Connecticut